Ladywood Estates is a historic district in Indianapolis, Indiana. Built in 1967, it consists of 14 contributing multi-family residential buildings, 16 contributing garage buildings, and one contributing object. Originally planned as apartments, the residential buildings vary in size and number of units. All structures maintain a mid-century modern design relating to the community's post-war era development. The buildings are limestone, brick, and wood siding, with post-and-beam construction typical of mid-century modern open design.

The community was planned by lawyer and developer Fredrick J. Capp, who purchased the land in 1965. Capp employed architect Avriel Shull to design it.

It was listed as a historic district on the National Register of Historic Places in 2019.

References 

Historic districts in Indianapolis
1967 establishments in Indiana
Mid-century modern
National Register of Historic Places in Indianapolis
Historic districts on the National Register of Historic Places in Indiana